Qiaolinxincheng station, is a station of Line S3 of the Nanjing Metro. It started operations on 6 December 2017.

References

Railway stations in Jiangsu
Railway stations in China opened in 2017
Nanjing Metro stations